Glasgow Maryhill was a parliamentary constituency represented in the House of Commons of the Parliament of the United Kingdom from 1918 to 2005 when it was subsumed into the new Glasgow North and Glasgow North East constituencies. It elected one Member of Parliament (MP) using the first-past-the-post voting system.

Boundaries 
1918–1950: "That portion of the city which is bounded by a line commencing at a point on the municipal boundary at the centre line of the North British Railway (Edinburgh and Glasgow Line) about 327 yards north of the centre of Hawthorn Street, where the said North British Railway intersects that street, thence south-eastward and southward along the centre of the said North British Railway to the centre line of Keppochhill Road, thence south-westward and westward along the centre line of Keppochhill Road to the centre line of Saracen Street, thence south-westward along the centre line of Possil Road to the centre line of the Forth and Clyde Canal, thence north-westward along the centre line of the Forth and Clyde Canal to a point in line with the centre line of Well Road, thence south-westward along the centre line of Well Road to the centre line of New City Road, thence westward along the centre line of Raeberry Street and Carlton Gardens to the centre line of Belmont Street, thence south-westward along the centre line of Belmont Street to the centre line of the River Kelvin, thence northwestward along the centre line of the River Kelvin to its intersection with the municipal boundary, thence north-eastward and south-eastward along the municipal boundary to the point of commencement."

1950–1974: The County of the City of Glasgow wards of Maryhill and Ruchill.

1974–1983: The County of the City of Glasgow wards of Cowcaddens, Maryhill, and Ruchill.

1983–1997: The City of Glasgow District electoral divisions of Milton/Ruchill, North Kelvin/Woodlands, and Summerston/Maryhill.

1997–2005: The City of Glasgow District electoral divisions of Milton/Possil, Summerston/Maryhill, and Woodside/North Kelvinside.

Members of Parliament

Elections

Elections in the 2000s

Elections in the 1990s

Elections in the 1980s

Elections in the 1970s

Elections in the 1960s

Elections in the 1950s

Elections in the 1940s

Elections in the 1930s

Elections in the 1920s

Elections in the 1910s

References 

Historic parliamentary constituencies in Scotland (Westminster)
Constituencies of the Parliament of the United Kingdom established in 1918
Constituencies of the Parliament of the United Kingdom disestablished in 2005
Politics of Glasgow
Maryhill